LMH may be:

 Lady Margaret Hall, Oxford, England
 Lady Mitchell Hall, Cambridge, England
 Lyell McEwin Hospital, Adelaide, Australia
 Le Mans Hypercar, FIA class of racing cars